Paul Brooke (born 22 November 1944) is a retired English actor of film, television and radio. He made his film debut in 1972 in the Hammer film Straight on till Morning, followed by performances in For Your Eyes Only (1981), Return of the Jedi (1983), Scandal (1989), Saving Grace (2000), Bridget Jones's Diary (2001), Alfie (2004), The Phantom of the Opera (2004), and Oliver Twist (2005). Brooke is the father of actor Tom Brooke.

Career
Brooke began as a stage actor and has played in many London productions, including several years as a member of Frank Dunlop's original Young Vic Company. He played Malakili the Rancor Keeper in the 1983 Star Wars film Return of the Jedi (his voiced dubbed over by Ernie Fosselius). He played British Conservative politician Ian Gow in the 2004 BBC series The Alan Clark Diaries. In 2006, he guest starred in the Doctor Who audio adventure Year of the Pig as well as the 1990 Mr. Bean sketch "The Library". He played Mr. Fitzherbert in the 2001 film Bridget Jones's Diary.

Other appearances in television dramas and comedies featuring Brooke include The Blackadder, Bertie and Elizabeth, the BBC adaptation of Blott on the Landscape, Lovejoy, Foyle's War, Rab C. Nesbitt, Kavanagh QC, Sharpe's Revenge, Midsomer Murders, Hustle, Covington Cross, The Kit Curran Radio Show, Between the Lines, Relic Hunter and Mornin' Sarge. He appeared in the miniseries Nostromo in 1997.

He played Gríma Wormtongue in the 1981 BBC radio adaptation of The Lord of the Rings.

He, Linal Haft and Frank Mills are the only actors to appear in both the Classic and New series of Minder, but playing different roles in each.

Filmography

Film

Television

External links

1944 births
English male radio actors
English male television actors
Living people
Male actors from London